Good Morning, Babylon is a 1987 drama film written and directed by Paolo and Vittorio Taviani, starring Vincent Spano, Joaquim de Almeida, Greta Scacchi, Désirée Nosbusch, Omero Antonutti, and Charles Dance. The film follows the story of two Italian brothers who emigrate to America and find work as set designers for D.W. Griffith's silent film epic Intolerance (1916).

The French-Italian co-production was screened out of competition at the 1987 Cannes Film Festival. It was a critical and financial hit in its native country, winning a Nastro d'Argento for Best Costume Design with an additional nomination for Best Supporting Actor.

Plot
Two Tuscan brothers, Nicola and Andrea Bonanno, come from a long line of artisans and church restorers. In 1911, they find themselves out of work without any real prospects. Hoping to find their fortunes elsewhere, they emigrate to the United States. Initially forced into precarious jobs, the two young man manage to find work in the Italian emigrant neighborhood of San Francisco. 

Thanks to their talent and with a bit of luck, they find themselves in the employ of film director D. W. Griffith, who is overseeing preproduction of his historical epic Intolerance and is looking for Italian-born set designers. The brothers find themselves working on the film's elaborate Babylonian period setpieces, while falling in love with two young extras; Edna and Mabel, whom they eventually marry.

Life, however, soon turns bitter for the brothers after Edna dies in childbirth. Rather than uniting the brothers, the tragedy only divides them.  Later on in World War I, Nicola and Andrea will meet and the camera, used by the army for military purposes, will be the dramatic witness of the epilogue of their lives.

Cast
 Vincent Spano as Nicola Bonanno
 Joaquim de Almeida as Andrea Bonanno
 Greta Scacchi as Edna Bonanno
 Désirée Nosbusch as Mabel Bonanno
 Omero Antonutti as Bonanno "Babbo"
 Bérangère Bonvoisin as Mrs. Griffith
 David Brandon as Mr. Grass, Griffith's Production Manager
 Brian Freilino as Mr. Thompson, Griffith's Assistant
 Charles Dance as D. W. Griffith
 Margarita Lozano as The Venetian
 Massimo Venturiello as Duccio Bonanno
 Andrea Prodan as Billy Bitzer

References

External links

 

1987 films
1980s English-language films
English-language Italian films
1980s Italian-language films
1987 drama films
Films directed by Paolo and Vittorio Taviani
Films about filmmaking
Films set in the 1910s
Films scored by Nicola Piovani
D. W. Griffith
1987 multilingual films
French multilingual films
Italian multilingual films
1980s Italian films